John Courts Bagby (January 24, 1819 – April 4, 1896) was a U.S. Representative from Illinois.

Born in Glasgow, Kentucky, Bagby attended the public schools.
He graduated as a civil engineer from Bacon College, Harrodsburg, Kentucky, in June 1840,
and studied law.
He was admitted to the bar in March 1845 and commenced practice in Rushville, Illinois, in April 1846.

Bagby was elected as a Democrat to the Forty-fourth Congress (March 4, 1875 – March 3, 1877).
He was not a candidate for renomination in 1876.
He resumed the practice of his profession in Rushville, Illinois.
He served as judge of Schuyler County 1882-1885.
He served as judge of the sixth judicial circuit court of Illinois 1885-1891.
He resumed the practice of law.
He died in Rushville, Illinois, April 4, 1896, aged 88 years, 9 months, and 0 days, and
was interred in Rushville Cemetery.

References

External links

1819 births
1896 deaths
Illinois state court judges
Democratic Party members of the United States House of Representatives from Illinois
19th-century American politicians
People from Glasgow, Kentucky
People from Rushville, Illinois
19th-century American judges